The Sarju (Kumaoni: सरज्यू, Hindi: सरयू), also known as Sarayu, is a major river draining Central Kumaon region  in the Indian state of Uttarakhand. Originating from Sarmul, Sarju flows through the cities of Kapkot, Bageshwar and Seraghat before joining Mahakali at Pancheshwar. The Sarju is the largest tributary of the Sharda River. The river forms the South-eastern border between the districts of Pithoragarh and Almora. Temperate and sub-Tropical forests cover the entire Catchment area of the River.

Etymology 
The name is the feminine derivative of the Sanskrit root सर् sar "to flow"; as a masculine stem,  means "air, wind", that is, "that which is streaming".

Course
The Sarju rises at a place known as Sarmul (or Sarmool), which is located in the extreme north of the Bageshwar district of Uttarakhand. About  further downstream, the river receives Lahor river from the right. Then the river turns towards south and flows through the city of Bageshwar, where it receives Gomati from the right.

The Sarju flows to the lower 65 km in mainly southeastern direction. Much of the drainage of Gangoli region of Pithoragarh district flows into the river via Bhadrapatigad stream, which flows into it from the left. Similarly, several streams join it from right draining much of the Chaugarkha region situated in Almora district; notable ones being Gatgadh, Jalairgadh, Bhaurgadh, Alaknadi and Saniaungadh. A small river Jaingan gets merge into Sarju river at Seraghat in Almora-Pithoragarh border.

Geology
Sarju transfers a sedimental load of 498.4 kg/sec during the peak of raining season.

Tributaries

Gomati

Gomati river originates in the higher reaches of Bhatkot and merges into Sarju at Bageshwar. It flows through the Katyur Valley which constitutes a major Agricultural zone of Kumaon.

Kuloor 
The Kuloor river rises above the Bhadrkali Temple near Sani-Udiyar, and flows through Rawatsera, Bans Patan and Ganai Gangoli, before joining the Sarju at Seraghat.

Punger
Punger river rises near village Sangar and joins Sarju from the left at Sartana.

Lahor

Lahor is a small river that joins Sarju from the right.

Panar
Panar originates on the northern slopes of the Mornaula Range, south-east of Almora. Panar joins Sarju near Rameshwar.

Ramganga

Ramganga East is the largest tributary of Sarju. It originates from the Namik Glacier in Pithoragarh district of Uttarakhand and flows towards Southeast. The river is fed by numerous small and big rivers and finally joins river Sarju at Rameshwar.

In epics 
The river is mentioned various times in the ancient Indian epic of Ramayana. Sarayu refers to Lower Ghaghara, which flows through the city of Ayodhya, the birth place of the Hindu deity Rama, who, along with the residents of Ayodhya, went to Vaikunth lok from  this river and became deities in the heaven afterwards.

In fiction
Sarayu is also the name of the river that flows by the fictional town of Malgudi created by the Indian writer R. K. Narayan.

Sarayu is the name given to the personification of the Holy Spirit in "The Shack" created by American Novelist William P. Young.

Gallery

References

Notes

Bibliography
 
 
 
 
 
 
 
 
 
 
 

Rivers of Uttarakhand
Rivers of India